Cham is a Unicode block containing characters of the Cham script, which is used for writing the Cham language, primarily used for the Eastern dialect in Cambodia and Vietnam.

A separate block for Western Cham, used in Cambodia, was first proposed to Unicode in 2016. As of May 2022 it is still being finalized.

History
The following Unicode-related documents record the purpose and process of defining specific characters in the Cham block:

References 

Unicode blocks